Sušić is a Bosnian surname. Notable people with the surname include:

Derviš Sušić (1925–1990), Bosniak writer
Mateo Sušić (born 1990), Bosnian football player
Safet Sušić (born 1955), Bosnian former footballer
Sead Sušić (born 1953), Bosnian former footballer
Tamara Sušić (born 1990), Croatian volleyball player
Tino-Sven Sušić (born 1992), Bosnian-born Belgian footballer

See also
Massimo Susic

Bosnian surnames